Bunturabie Effuah Rashida Jalloh (born 10 May 1998) is a Sierra Leonean swimmer.

Biography
Jalloh was born in Bo in 1998 in southern Sierra Leone. She grew up in Freetown. She attended the Bilingual High School Murray Town.

Jalloh went to the 2015 All Africa Games in Brazzaville. She won two bronze medals as part of a team at the 5th Africa Zone two (2) championship in Senegal at both the 4x100 and 4x200 freestyle relays.

She placed 88th in the 50 metre freestyle event at the 2016 Summer Olympics with a time of 39.85 seconds, setting a national record. She did not advance to the semifinals. She was the flagbearer for Sierra Leone during the opening ceremony.

References

External links

 

1998 births
Living people
Sierra Leonean female swimmers
Olympic swimmers of Sierra Leone
Swimmers at the 2016 Summer Olympics
Place of birth missing (living people)
People from Bo, Sierra Leone
Commonwealth Games competitors for Sierra Leone
Swimmers at the 2018 Commonwealth Games